Deacon Blue are a Scottish pop rock band formed in Glasgow during 1985. The line-up of the band consists of vocalists Ricky Ross and Lorraine McIntosh, keyboard player James Prime and drummer Dougie Vipond. The band released their debut album, Raintown, on 1 May 1987 in the United Kingdom and in the United States in February 1988. Their second album, When the World Knows Your Name (1989), topped the UK Albums Chart for two weeks, and included "Real Gone Kid" which became their first top ten single in the UK Singles Chart and reached number one in Spain.

Deacon Blue released their fourth album, Whatever You Say, Say Nothing,  in 1993. The band split in 1994, following which Vipond began a career in television. Five years later, the band held a reunion gig, and this led on to a new album, Walking Back Home, with the band now working on a part-time basis. The band released another album, Homesick, in 2001. Though Graeme Kelling died from pancreatic cancer in 2004, the band has continued and 2006 saw Deacon Blue returning to the studio to record three new tracks for a Singles album – including the track "Bigger than Dynamite". Deacon Blue's next album was The Hipsters, in 2012. The band released another album, A New House, in September 2014. Believers, was released in September 2016.  A concert recording of their return to the Barrowlands, Glasgow, was released on 31 March 2017.

The band's ninth studio album City of Love was released on 6 March 2020. In February 2021, they released their tenth studio album entitled Riding on the Tide of Love to commercial success in the UK.

As of 2020, Deacon Blue's total album sales stood at seven million, with twelve UK top 40 singles, along with two number one albums in the UK.

Career

1985–1987: Formation and early years
Taking their name from the 1977 Steely Dan song "Deacon Blues", Deacon Blue were formed in 1985 following Ricky Ross's move from Dundee to Glasgow.  Along with Ross, the group originally consisted of Lorraine McIntosh, James Prime, Dougie Vipond, Ewen Vernal and Graeme Kelling.

Ross, a former school teacher originally from Dundee, was the group's frontman, penning the majority of Deacon Blue's songs. He married vocalist Lorraine McIntosh in 1990. In 1986, the band contributed a track ("Take the Saints Away") to a compilation cassette entitled "Honey at the Core", featuring then up-and-coming Glasgow bands, including Wet Wet Wet, The Bluebells, Kevin McDermott (singer-songwriter), The Big Dish, and Hue and Cry.

1987–1991: Raintown and When The World Knows Your Name
The band's debut album, Raintown, produced by Jon Kelly was released in 1987. It spawned the singles "Dignity", "Chocolate Girl" and "Loaded". The city that the album's title refers to is Glasgow and the cover art of the album is a photograph (by the Scottish-Italian photographer Oscar Marzaroli) of the River Clyde's docks taken from Kelvingrove Park. It proved a commercial success and has to date sold around a million copies, peaking in the UK Albums Chart at no. 14 and remaining in the charts for a year and a half. On 27 February 2006, Raintown was reissued as part of Columbia's Legacy Edition series. The reissue was expanded to two CDs, the first of which featured the original 11 track album. The second CD featured alternate cuts of all 11 album tracks, as well as the two original CD bonus tracks "Riches" and "Kings of the Western World". The new edition did not include the varied bonus cuts (remixes and b-sides) that were found on the singles from the album.

The second album, 1989's When the World Knows Your Name, was the band's most commercially successful, reaching No. 1 in the UK Albums Chart and generating five UK top 30 hits, including "Real Gone Kid", "Wages Day", and "Fergus Sings the Blues" (all five singles from the album were top 10 hits in Ireland). The following year saw the band play in front of an estimated 250,000 fans at the free concert on Glasgow Green, "The Big Day", which was held to celebrate Glasgow being named that year's European City of Culture. The band also played Glastonbury and the Roskilde festivals that summer, as well as released Ooh Las Vegas, a double album of B-sides, extra tracks, film tracks, and sessions which reached No. 3 in the UK Albums Chart.

1991–1994: Continued success and split

Jon Kelly returned to the producer's chair in 1991 for the album Fellow Hoodlums. The album was met with more critical approval and peaked at No. 2 on the UK Albums Chart. Fellow Hoodlums was followed up by 1993's Whatever You Say, Say Nothing, a much more experimental album. The album was not as commercially successful as the previous two albums, peaking at No. 4 on the UK Albums Chart. Changing from producer Jon Kelly to the team of Steve Osborne and Paul Oakenfold, this album presented a change in musical style for Deacon Blue. While the band's songwriting remained based in rock and blues, many of the tracks moved into alternative rock territory in their presentation.

The band embarked on another sold out UK tour in 1994, after recording new material for their greatest hits compilation album, Our Town. This saw the band return to No. 1 in the UK Albums Chart and was one of the year's top sellers, while "I Was Right and You Were Wrong" and a re-release of "Dignity" saw the band re-enter the Top 20 of the UK Singles Chart. The album contained the previous singles from the band, minus "Closing Time" and "Hang Your Head". The album also contained three new tracks.  "I Was Right and You Were Wrong", the first single from this album, was an alternative rock track that continued and expanded the musical direction the band had taken with Whatever You Say, Say Nothing. "Bound to Love" and "Still in the Mood" were pop songs in the tradition of Deacon Blue's earlier albums. The vinyl LP version of the album contained a fourth new track, "Beautiful Stranger". "Dignity" was released, now for the third time, as the second single from the album.

With Vipond's decision to quit the group in favour of a career in television, Deacon Blue split up in 1994.

1999–2006: Re-formation and new material

Five years later, the band held a reunion gig in 1999, and this led on to a new album, Walking Back Home, with the band now working on a part-time basis. The Walking Back Home album combined eight songs that were brand new compositions, previously unreleased tracks, or released only with limited availability, with nine previously released Deacon Blue songs. This was followed by another album, Homesick, in 2001.

Graeme Kelling died from pancreatic cancer in 2004, but the band continued and recorded three new tracks for a Singles album – including the track "Bigger than Dynamite" in 2006.

2006–2012: Touring and side projects
The band performed at Manchester United's Old Trafford stadium, as the pre-match entertainment for the Rugby league Super League Grand Final on 14 October 2006, and continued on to a full UK tour in November. They were also due to open Stirling's New Year party in 2006, but this was cancelled at the last minute due to extreme weather.  A further tour followed in November 2007 and the band then provided support for Simple Minds in 2008.  They also appeared at Stirling's Hogmanay in 2008.

Deacon Blue appeared at The Homecoming Live Final Fling Show, at Glasgow's SECC on 28 November 2009, and headlined Glasgow's Hogmanay on 31 December 2009. The band performed several gigs, including Glastonbury, and the Liverpool Echo Arena on 29 July 2011.

Ross, who had released a solo album before the formation of Deacon Blue, released two solo albums during the time between Deacon Blue's breakup in 1994 and reformation in 1999. Due to Deacon Blue's part-time status after reformation, Ross released additional solo albums in 2002 and 2005 and has written for and with other recording artists. In 2009, Ross and McIntosh recorded an album together under the name 'McIntosh Ross'.

2012–2013: New record label and The Hipsters

Deacon Blue last released a studio album in 2001, which was Homesick and in 2006, they released a compilation album, Singles. In 2012, it was announced Deacon Blue had signed a recording contract and would release a new album that year.

To promote the upcoming release of their new album, the group released a single, "The Hipsters". The single was released in the United Kingdom on 23 September 2012. The album The Hipsters was released on 24 September 2012 and was produced by Paul Savage.  A 25th anniversary tour, starting in October 2012, followed. The band performed with the BBC Scottish Symphony Orchestra at the Grand Hall in Glasgow to promote the release of the album.

All of the band's studio albums were reissued as deluxe editions by Edsel Records in October 2012, as well as a new compilation entitled The Rest.

2013–2018: A New House and Believers
Deacon Blue arranged dates in 2014 for a comeback tour. It was announced in April 2014 that their seventh studio album, A New House, would be released on 8 September that year. Ross later said the album had "come off the energy of getting back together, playing live", referring to their touring during 2012. Deacon Blue also performed at the Glasgow 2014 Commonwealth Games closing ceremony on 3 August 2014, performing their hit, "Dignity".

A new studio album, Believers, was released on 30 September 2016.  Three promo singles, the title track, "This Is A Love Song" and "Gone" have been released. A tour was undertaken to promote the album, culminating in a return to the Glasgow Barrowlands on 4 December 2016, which was recorded for a live album as well as video.  This was released on 31 March 2017 on vinyl, CD, DVD, Blu-Ray as well as digital download of both audio and video versions. A special screening event was held, the day before, at the Glasgow Film Theatre.

Between February and March 2018, Deacon Blue embarked on a tour of Spain, marking the first time that the band has played a series of live shows in Spain. The band described the shows as "an incredible experience for us all", and later confirmed that Deacon Blue will be returning to Spain in 2019 for another series of live shows, claiming that "Spain has a very special place in our hearts".

2018–2021: City of Love

The band released their ninth studio album entitled City of Love on 6 March 2020, to critical acclaim. The album received positive reviews and achieved commercial success. The album charted at number one in their native Scotland, number four in the United Kingdom and peaked at number fifty in Spain.

2021–present: Riding on the Tide of Love

During the COVID-19 pandemic, the band recorded and released their tenth studio album entitled Riding on the Tide of Love which was released in February 2021. The album failed to reach the same level of commercial success in the United Kingdom that the band experienced with their previous album, City of Love, with the album debuting at number 23 on the charts, spending only one week before dropping out of the UK Top 100 album charts. In their native Scotland, the album performed better, debuting at number two and spending additional weeks within the Scottish Top 40 albums charts.

To promote the release of the album, the band announced the Riding on the Tide of Love tour which is scheduled to begin in June 2021 in Brighton and concludes on 19 December 2021 at the SSE Hydro in Glasgow.

Members

Current members
 Ricky Ross – lead vocals, piano
 James Prime – keyboards, piano 
 Lorraine McIntosh – backing and lead vocals, percussion 
 Dougie Vipond – drums, percussion 
 Gregor Philp – guitar
 Lewis Gordon – bass

Past members
Graeme Kelling – guitar
Ewen Vernal – bass, keyboard bass
Mick Slaven – guitar
 Scott Fraser – bass
 Taj Wyzgowski – guitar 
Ged Grimes – bass
Chris Henderson - drums

Discography

Studio albums
 Raintown (1987)
 When the World Knows Your Name (1989)
 Fellow Hoodlums (1991)
 Whatever You Say, Say Nothing (1993)
 Walking Back Home (1999) 
 Homesick (2001)
 The Hipsters (2012)
 A New House (2014)
 Believers (2016)
 City of Love (2020)
 Riding on the Tide of Love (2021)

Awards and nominations

BRIT Awards

Other awards

In 2020, Deacon Blue's 1987 single "Dignity" was voted as Scotland's greatest song after a public vote voted through the radio programme Ewen Cameron in the Morning.

References

External links
 Official Deacon Blue / Ricky Ross Site
 Deacon Blue live at Cornbury Music Festival UK July 2006
 Glasgowskyline.com

Scottish pop music groups
Scottish rock music groups
Scottish alternative rock groups
Scottish pop rock music groups
Sophisti-pop musical groups
Musical groups from Glasgow
Musical groups established in 1985
Musical groups disestablished in 1994
Musical groups reestablished in 1999
1985 establishments in Scotland
Columbia Records artists
Chrysalis Records artists